Results from the III Grand Prix du Roussillon held at Circuit des platanes de Perpignan on April 25, 1948, as Formula Two. The Grand Prix is raced in 40 laps with the best drivers from the two 27 laps heats.

Entry list

Entrant in italic were not present.

Classification

Heat 1

Heat 2

Final

Pole position: ?
Fastest lap: Maurice Trintignant in 1:32.9

References

Roussillon Grand Prix
Roussillon Grand Prix
Roussillon Grand Prix